The 2011–12 season was the 106th season in Atlético Madrid's history and their 75th season in La Liga, the top division of Spanish football. It covers a period from 1 July 2011 to 30 June 2012.

Atlético Madrid competed for their tenth La Liga title and participated in the UEFA Europa League, entering in the Third qualifying round due to their seventh-place finish in the 2010–11 La Liga. They also entered the Copa del Rey in the Round of 32 where they were eliminated by Segunda B club Albecete 3–1 on aggregate. On 9 May 2012, They won the Europa League after beating Athletic Bilbao 3–0 in the final to give Diego Simeone his first trophy with the club when he was appointed in December after the sacking of Gregorio Manzano.

Kits 
Supplier: Nike / Main Sponsors: Rixos Hotels, Huawei (both temporary) / Back Sponsor: Kyocera

Players

Squad information

Transfers 
IN

OUT

Club

Coaching staff

Team stats 

Note:Italic denotes no longer with club.

Last updated: 22 February

Competitions

Pre-season

Mid-season friendlies

La Liga

League table

Results by round

Matches 

Kickoff times are in CET.

Copa del Rey 

Kickoff times are in CET.

Round of 32

UEFA Europa League 

Kickoff times are in CET.

Third qualifying round

Play-off round

Group stage

Knockout phase

Round of 32

Round of 16

Quarter-finals

Semi-finals

Final

See also 
 2011–12 Copa del Rey
 2011–12 La Liga
 2011–12 UEFA Europa League

References

External links 
  
 2011–12 Atlético Madrid season at ESPN

Atlético Madrid
Atlético Madrid seasons
Atlético Madrid
UEFA Europa League-winning seasons